Nautsa’mawt Football Club (formerly known as Varsity FC) is a Canadian semi-professional soccer club based in West Point Grey, Vancouver, British Columbia that plays in League1 British Columbia.

History

Varsity FC

Varsity FC was officially unveiled on December 3, 2021, as an inaugural licence holder for the first season of the new semi-professional League1 British Columbia in 2022.  The team was formed in partnership with the University of British Columbia and their Thunderbirds sports teams with the head coaches of both the UBC men's and women's soccer teams serving as the club's inaugural head coaches. In addition, Varsity's home stadium will be UBC's Thunderbird Stadium with select games being played on the field at the Rashpal Dhillon Track & Field Oval, also located on the UBC campus.

Their inaugural matches, for the male and female teams, occurred on May 26 against Unity FC, with both sides winning their matches 2-0. Their home debut occurred on June 4, with the men defeating the Victoria Highlanders 3-0, while the women defeated the Highlanders 3-2. They won the 2022 Juan de Fuca Plate as the League1 BC club with the greatest number of combined points between the men's and women's divisions during the regular season. Varsity finished atop the regular season standings for both the men's and women's divisions in the debut season, advancing to the championship finals. In the women's final, Varsity was defeated by Vancouver Whitecaps Girls Elite, while the men were defeated by TSS Rovers FC in a penalty shootout. Despite losing in the finals, the women's team represented L1BC at the League1 Canada Interprovincial Championship, as the Whitecaps were unable to attend, where they finished in 4th place, following defeats to PLSQ side AS Blainville in the semi-finals and losing in a penalty shootout to League1 Ontario side Alliance United FC in the third-place match.

Nautsa’mawt FC
In January 2023, the club went under a change of ownership with UBC Athletics transferring ownership to Hope and Health For Life Society, a non-profit which aims to increase access to sport for development and social impact opportunities with a focus on Indigenous children and youth. As part of the ownership transfer, the club would also rebrand the club name.  In February 2023, the club officially re-branded as Nautsa’mawt FC. The name was inspired by the Hul'qumi'num term, Nautsa’mawt, which means "One Heart, One Mind".

Seasons

Men

Women

Notable players
The following players have either played at the professional or international level, either before or after playing for the League1 BC team:

Men

Women

References

Soccer clubs in British Columbia
Varsity
Association football clubs established in 2021
2021 establishments in British Columbia